"Take a Chance on Me" is a song by English boy band JLS from their third studio album, Jukebox. It was released as the album's second single on 4 November 2011. The ballad was written by Emile Ghantous, Frankie Bautista, Nasri Atweh and Nick Turpin, and it was produced by Nasri Atweh and Emile Ghantous. The song debuted at number two on the UK Singles Chart, selling 67,850 copies in its first week.

Critical reception
Critics praised the song. Caroline Sullivan of The Guardian called it "a wet, Bruno Mars-apeing ballad saved by pretty nifty harmonies." Entertainment website 4Music described the song as "the perfect October ballad". Digital Spy's Lewis Corner gave the song three out of five stars, comparing the song to Bing Crosby recording of "Do You Hear What I Hear?" and calling it a "customary boyband composition of feather-light beats and smooth piano".

Chart performance
In Ireland, the song debuted at number thirteen on the chart dated 10 November 2011. In the UK, although the song reached number one on the mid-week chart update, the song debuted at number 2, behind the sixth week sales of Rihanna's "We Found Love".

Music video
A lyric video for "Take a Chance on Me" premiered on YouTube on 24 September 2011, four days after the song first premiered on radio stations across the United Kingdom.

A music video was released on 21 October 2011, featuring the members singing at London sights at night, path walk of the River Thames, the Tower Bridge and the London Eye illuminated.

Live performances
The band performed the song live for the first time during the live shows of the eighth series of The X Factor.

Track listing
 Digital download
 "Take a Chance on Me" - 3:36
 "Take a Chance on Me" (Soul Seekerz Club Mix) - 7:17
 "Take a Chance on Me" (The Wideboys Club Mix) - 5:41
 "Unstoppable" - 4:21

 CD single
 "Take a Chance on Me" - 3:40
 "Unstoppable" - 4:21

Charts

Weekly charts

Year-end charts

Certifications

Release history

References

2011 singles
JLS songs
Pop ballads
Songs written by Nasri (musician)
Songs written by Emile Ghantous